Sankt Thomas is a village in the district Bitburg-Prüm, in Rhineland-Palatinate, Germany. It is situated in the Eifel. The name refers to the Archbishop of Canterbury Thomas Becket.

References

Bitburg-Prüm